This is a list of Members of the Scottish Parliament (MSPs) who were returned to the fifth session of the Scottish Parliament. Of the 129 MSPs returned at the 2016 general election, 73 were returned from first past the post constituencies with a further 56 members returned from eight regions, each electing seven MSPs as a form of mixed member proportional representation.

Parliament reconvened on 12 May 2016 with the swearing-in of MSPs and the election of the presiding officer and two deputy presiding officers. Queen Elizabeth II formally opened the fifth session on 2 July 2016.

Composition 

Government parties denoted with bullets (•)

Graphical representation
These are graphical representations of the Scottish Parliament showing a comparison of party strengths as it was directly after the 2016 general election and its composition at dissolution:

  

Note this is not the official seating plan of the Scottish Parliament.

List of MSPs 
This is a list of MSPs. The changes table below records all changes in party affiliation during the session, since the May 2016 election.

Former MSPs

Changes

References

External links
 Scottish Parliament website
 Current and previous Members of the Scottish Parliament (MSPs), on the Scottish Parliament website

5